Đà Nẵng station is one of the main railway stations on the North–South Railway (Reunification Express) in Vietnam and one of the five largest stations in Vietnam. It serves the city of Đà Nẵng.

Đà Nẵng station is one of the three largest train stations of Vietnam serving daily trains from the north to the south and vice versa that stop for long enough for a relatively large number of passengers to get on or off. The facilities of Đà Nẵng station are relatively modern, secure and hygienic. Besides North–South routes, the station serves provincial routes such as to Huế, Quảng Bình, Vinh, Quy Nhơn, and Ho Chi Minh City. Passengers have diverse options with different classes to any of these stations: odd numbers (E1, S1, S3, S5, S7 and SD1) go from the north to the south coded, even numbers (E2, S2, S4, S6 and S8) go from the south to the north.

References

News and magazines

External links 

Buildings and structures in Da Nang
Railway stations in Vietnam